Victorivirus is a genus of viruses, in the family Totiviridae. Filamentous fungi serve as natural hosts. There are 14 species in this genus.

Structure
Viruses in Victorivirus are non-enveloped, with icosahedral geometries, and T=2 symmetry. The diameter is around 40 nm. Genomes are linear, around 4.6-6.7kb in length. The genome has 2 open reading frames.

Life cycle
Viral replication is cytoplasmic. Entry into the host cell is achieved by virus remains intracellular. Replication follows the double-stranded RNA virus replication model. Double-stranded RNA virus transcription is the method of transcription. Translation takes place by RNA termination-reinitiation. The virus exits the host cell by cell to cell movement.
Filamentous fungi serve as the natural host.

Taxonomy 
The genus Victorivirus includes the following species:
 Aspergillus foetidus slow virus 1
 Beauveria bassiana victorivirus 1
 Chalara elegans RNA Virus 1
 Coniothyrium minitans RNA virus
 Epichloe festucae virus 1
 Gremmeniella abietina RNA virus L1
 Helicobasidium mompa totivirus 1-17
 Helminthosporium victoriae virus 190S
 Magnaporthe oryzae virus 1
 Magnaporthe oryzae virus 2
 Rosellinia necatrix victorivirus 1
 Sphaeropsis sapinea RNA virus 1
 Sphaeropsis sapinea RNA virus 2
 Tolypocladium cylindrosporum virus 1

References

External links
 Viralzone: Victorivirus
 ICTV

Totiviridae
Mycoviruses
Virus genera